National Day is a national holiday in Vietnam observed on 2 September, commemorating President Hồ Chí Minh reading the Declarations of independence of Vietnam at Ba Đình Square in Hanoi on 2 September 1945. It is the country's National Day.

History
During World War II, the Japanese occupied Vietnam and allowed the French to remain and exert some influence. At the war's end in August 1945, a power vacuum was created in Vietnam. Capitalizing on this, the Việt Minh launched the "August Revolution" across the country to seize government offices. Emperor Bảo Đại abdicated on 25 August 1945, ending the Nguyễn dynasty. On 2 September 1945, at Ba Đình Square, Hanoi, Ho Chi Minh, leader of the Viet Minh, declared Vietnam's independence under the new name of the Democratic Republic of Vietnam (DRVN) in a speech that invoked the United States Declaration of Independence and the French Revolution's Declaration of the Rights of Man and the Citizen.

Establishment
Leading up to, and then following, the end of the Vietnam War, the Communist Party of Vietnam (thereafter the government of a united Vietnam) established a unified list of national holidays.  These new holidays were to include the International Labour Day on 1 May, the anniversary of the August Revolution on 19 August, Viet Nam's National Day on 2 September, and Ho Chi Minh's birthday on 19 May. The lunar new year, Tết Nguyên Đán and the mid-autumn moon, Tết Trung Thu, continued to be observed as traditionally.

The list of full public holidays in Vietnam has been revised since 2007 but National Day, 2 September, remains a full public and bank holiday. By 2019, the holiday was lengthened by one day by adding one day immediately before or after 2 September.

References

External links
 Vietnamese 70th anniversary National Day Parade

Public holidays in Vietnam
September observances
National days